Xerosiphon is a genus of plants in the family Amaranthaceae.

Species include:
Xerosiphon angustiflorus
Xerosiphon aphyllus

References 

Amaranthaceae
Amaranthaceae genera
Taxa named by Nikolai Turczaninow